The Night That Made America Famous is a 1975 musical revue featuring the songs of Harry Chapin. The music consists of a combination of songs written for the musical and songs from Chapin's previous albums, the latter including "What Made America Famous?", a song about a plumber who rescues a group of hippies from a fire, which includes the lyric that gave the musical its title.

Chapin appeared in the musical, alongside a cast that included a young Lynne Thigpen. Chapin's brothers Tom and Stephen, in addition to being featured performers, were also in the pit. The production was directed by Gene Frankel. It opened at the Ethel Barrymore Theatre in New York on February 26, 1975, after fourteen previews, and closed on April 5, 1975 after 47 performances.

Awards and nominations

1975 Tony Award nominations
 Tony Award for Best Featured Actor in a Musical - Gilbert Price
 Tony Award for Best Featured Actress in a Musical - Kelly Garrett

1975 Drama Desk Award nominations
 Drama Desk Award for Outstanding Featured Actor in a Musical - Gilbert Price
 Drama Desk Award for Outstanding Featured Actress in a Musical - Kelly Garrett

References

External links

Broadway musicals
1975 musicals
Jukebox musicals